In chemistry, autoprotolysis is a chemical reaction in which a proton  is transferred between two identical molecules, one of which acts as a Brønsted acid, releasing a proton which is accepted by the other molecule acting as a Brønsted base. For example, water undergoes autoprotolysis in the self-ionization of water reaction. It is a type of molecular autoionization.

2H2O <=> OH- + H3O+

Any solvent that contains both acidic hydrogen and lone pairs of electrons to accept  can undergo autoprotolysis.

For example, ammonia in its purest form may undergo autoprotolysis: 
2NH3 <=> NH2- + NH4+
Another example is acetic acid:

2CH3COOH <=> CH3COO- + CH3COOH2+

References 

Acid–base chemistry
Equilibrium chemistry